Campbell's Covered Bridge is a wooden covered bridge in northeastern Greenville County, South Carolina, near the small town of Gowensville, and crosses Beaverdam Creek off Pleasant Hill Road.

Campbell's Covered Bridge is the last remaining covered bridge in South Carolina. 
It is owned by Greenville County, which closed it to motorized traffic in the early 1980s.  The bridge was added to the National Register of Historic Places on July 1, 2009.

History
The bridge was built in 1909 by Charles Irwin Willis (1878–1966) and was named for grist mill owner Alexander Lafayette Campbell (1836–1920), who built and maintained the nearby mill for many years, portions of which remain.

The Campbell bridge has been restored twice, first in 1964 by the Crescent Garden Club, and then in 1990.

The land surrounding the bridge was owned by Sylvia Pittman from 1991 until 2008, when she sold  to the Greenville County Recreation District. She said, "I had in mind to have a park preserve this to let everyone enjoy this like we have." The  for creating the park was covered by state and county grants.

Structure
It was constructed in the relatively rare four-span, Howe truss design and features vertical iron rods and diagonal pine timbers.

References

External links

Bridges completed in 1909
Buildings and structures in Greenville County, South Carolina
Road bridges on the National Register of Historic Places in South Carolina
Wooden bridges in South Carolina
National Register of Historic Places in Greenville County, South Carolina
Transportation in Greenville County, South Carolina
Tourist attractions in Greenville County, South Carolina
Covered bridges on the National Register of Historic Places in South Carolina
Howe truss bridges in the United States